Hajar Khatoon Mosque (in Kurdish: مزگت هاجه رخاتوون, in Persian: مسجد هاجرخاتون) is architecturally a unique and ancient Muslim mosque (now a tourist destination) in the city of Sanandaj in Kurdistan Province, Iran.

Hajar Khatoon Mosque was built more than hundred years ago by Haj Sheikh Shokrollah who was a very prominent Sunni cleric or Sheikh in that region.

Shrine 
In 813 AD and after the death of Hajar Khatoon; daughter of Seventh Shīʻa Imām and sister of eighth Shīʻa Imām, a shrine was built to commemorate her memory and later it became a place where pilgrims from all over the country come to visit.

See also 
 Iranian architecture
 Kurdistan
 List of famous mosques

References 
 Cultural Heritage and Tourism; Kurdistan Province
 Hajar Khatoon Tomb

Mosques in Iran
9th-century mosques
Buildings and structures in Kurdistan Province
Tourist attractions in Kurdistan Province